Neomarkia is a genus of moths belonging to the family Tortricidae.

Species
Neomarkia trifascia (Razowski, 2001)

See also
List of Tortricidae genera

References

 , 2001, Shilap Revista de Lepidopterologia 29: 277
 , 2005, World Catalogue of Insects 5

External links
tortricidae.com

Euliini
Tortricidae genera